Edward Gallagher (December 20, 1829 – March 8, 1896) was an American businessman and politician from New York.

Life 
Gallagher was born on December 20, 1829 in Albany, New York. His parents were Irish immigrants.

He attended public school in Albany and Hicks' Business College in Buffalo. He moved to Buffalo as a boy, and had an office in the Buffalo Central Wharf. He forwarded grain East over the Erie Canal. He was a founding member and trustee of the Buffalo Merchants' Exchange, and a member of the Ancient Order of United Workmen.

In 1874, Gallagher was elected to the New York State Assembly as a Republican, representing Erie County, 3rd District. He would serve in the Assembly in 1875, 1876, 1877, 1886, 1887, 1888, 1891, 1892, and 1893.

Gallagher's wife's name was Martha. Their children were William B., Kate C., Frank B., James H., and Robert W.

He died at home on March 8, 1896. He was buried in Forest Lawn Cemetery.

References

External links 

The Political Graveyard
Edward Gallagher at Find a Grave

1829 births
1896 deaths
Politicians from Albany, New York
American people of Irish descent
Businesspeople from Buffalo, New York
Politicians from Buffalo, New York
Republican Party members of the New York State Assembly
19th-century American politicians
Burials at Forest Lawn Cemetery (Buffalo)
Businesspeople from Albany, New York
19th-century American businesspeople